Ceolodiscus is a genus in the gastropod family Euomphalidae from the Lower and Middle Jurassic of Europe. The shell is small but stocky; involute or with a slightly protruding spire. Whorls are generally smooth, evenly rounded and slightly overlapping; umbilicus deep, aperture ovate. Is the oldest known holoplanktonic gastropod, thanks to a bilateral symmetrical shells as an adaption to active swimming. Also the most common of the sea snails of the Posidonienschiefer Formation, it is also one of the most varied in size terms, with some of the biggest specimens of snail from the Lower Toarcian know. It has been related to large floating driftwood as one of the primary settlers.

References

Teichert, S., & Nützel, A. (2015). Early Jurassic anoxia triggered the evolution of the oldest holoplanktonic gastropod Coelodiscus minutus by means of heterochrony. Acta Palaeontologica Polonica, 60(2), 269–276.
J. B. Knight et al. 1960. Systematic descriptions; Treatise on Invertebrate Paleontology, Part I, Mollusca (1):I196.
Coelodiscus

Gastropod genera
Euomphalidae
Jurassic gastropods
Jurassic animals of Europe
Fossil taxa described in 1909